The Tea Gardens-Hawks Nest Bridge is a road bridge that carries Myall Street across the Myall River, connecting the towns of Tea Gardens and Hawks Nest on the Mid North Coast of New South Wales, Australia.

The concrete box girder bridge is commonly known as the Singing Bridge, derived from the musical sounds its railings generate during strong winds acting as a wind harp.

History
About 1928, a ferry service started carrying passengers between the two townships across the Myall River. Later, cars were added, resulting in peak queues during holiday periods of up to six hours. The Tea Gardens-Hawks Nest Bridge was completed and opened by the New South Wales Minister for Public Works on 6 April 1974.  In response to this demand a 1.2 million bridge was placed immediately downstream, eliminating the ferry service.

Description
The bridge is of girder construction, made of both prestressed and reinforced concrete.

The Jean Shaw Koala Reserve is located at its northeastern end, part of a wildlife corridor to the Myall Lakes. Koalas have been known to cross the bridge at night.

References

External links
 
 

Box girder bridges
Bridges completed in 1974
Concrete bridges in Australia
Mid-Coast Council
Road bridges in New South Wales
1974 establishments in Australia